Chatfield Dam and Reservoir is a dam and artificial lake located on the South Platte River, south of Littleton, Colorado. The dam and reservoir were built by the United States Army Corps of Engineers as a response to the disastrous flood of 1965. In addition to its primary purpose of flood control, it serves as one of many water supply reservoirs for the city of Denver, Colorado. In 1966, the U.S. Atomic Energy Commission projected a total federal cost of $74 million. Construction of the project was begun in 1967 and the dam was completed in 1975.

The lake drains an area of more than 3,000 square miles (8,000 km2).

Chatfield State Park
The reservoir is surrounded by Chatfield State Park, a recreation area with boating, horseback riding and camping. A secondary inflow from the south is Plum Creek. A tertiary inflow from the west is Deer Creek.

There are 212 bird species that are frequently found at Chatfield Reservoir. These birds either permanently live there or just go there to rest after long migrations. There is a Chatfield bird watch list that anyone can access. The bald eagle, white pelican and burrowing owl have been seen.

Chatfield Reservoir Reallocation Project
The project involved moving some of the surrounding park's facilities back from the new, higher lake levels.

See also
Cherry Creek Dam & Reservoir
Bear Creek & Reservoir

References

External links
Tri-Lakes Projects (Official site) - U.S. Army Corps of Engineers
Chatfield Lake Area Map - Colorado Parks & Wildlife
Chatfield conditions and fishing reports
Chatfield Storage Reallocation Project website

Reservoirs in Colorado
Bodies of water of Douglas County, Colorado
Tourist attractions in Jefferson County, Colorado
Protected areas of Jefferson County, Colorado
United States Army Corps of Engineers dams
Dams in Colorado
Buildings and structures in Douglas County, Colorado
Buildings and structures in Jefferson County, Colorado
Dams completed in 1975